Benjamin Dutreux is a French sailor born on 5 April 1990 in Villeneuve-d'Ascq. He is competing in the 2020–2021 Vendée Globe finishing 9th in a time of 81d 19h 45m 20s.

References

External links
 Vendee Campaign Website

1990 births
Living people
People from Villeneuve-d'Ascq
Sportspeople from Nord (French department)
French male sailors (sport)
Class 40 class sailors
IMOCA 60 class sailors
French Vendee Globe sailors
2020 Vendee Globe sailors
Vendée Globe finishers
Single-handed circumnavigating sailors